On January 17, 2018, a Bell UH-1H Iroquois helicopter of Sapphire Aviation crashed near Raton, New Mexico, United States. Five of the six people on board were killed. The sole survivor was in serious condition.

Aircraft
The aircraft involved was a Bell UH-1H Iroquois, registration N658H, msn 9856.

The aircraft served with the United States Army (as serial number "67-17658") and saw action during the Vietnam War, it crashed on 31 May 1969 at Firebase Eagles Nest. It was returned to the United States and repaired and used by the Ohio Army National Guard before being retired to the Firelands Military Museum in Ohio.

Accident
The helicopter crashed and caught fire east of Raton, New Mexico. The pilot, pilot rated passenger, and three of the four passengers on board were killed, including Zimbabwean politician Roy Bennett and British world record holder Charles Burnett III. Burnett had set the record for a steam-powered car in 2009. The sole survivor, Andra Cobb, was the daughter of the pilot rated passenger Paul Cobb, and the long term romantic partner of Charles Burnett. The aircraft was flying from Raton Municipal Airport to a site in Folsom, New Mexico. It crashed at about 18:00 local time. The Albuquerque Journal reported that the pilot had said that there had been mechanical problems with the helicopter the day before the accident. It was stated that these had been fixed before the fatal flight.

Investigation
The US National Transportation Safety Board opened an investigation into the accident. The report cited pilot error, determining pilot Coleman Dodd was flying too low. Investigators said a low therapeutic amount of an antihistamine was found in his blood but could not say with certainty it contributed to his inability to avoid crashing.

References

2018 in New Mexico
Aviation accidents and incidents in the United States in 2018
Aviation accidents and incidents in New Mexico
January 2018 events in the United States
Accidents and incidents involving helicopters
Raton, New Mexico